The Tomahawk: A Saturday Journal of Satire was a weekly satirical magazine published between 1867 and 1870, price 2d. It was edited by Arthur à Beckett and the artist was Matt Morgan. Other contributors included Gilbert à Beckett, Frank Marshall, Alfred Thompson (who later founded The Mask), the composer Frederic Clay, and Thomas Gibson Bowles.

References

Christopher Kent, 'The Angry Young Men of Tomahawk,' in Garlick & Harris, eds., Victorian Journalism: Exotic and Domestic (1998), pp. 75–94.

External links

Snapshot:Tomahawk at nineteenth-century serials edition
Waterloo Directory
The complete run of the Tomahawk is available at the nineteenth-century serials edition (NCSE)
Tomahawk (1867-1870) (NCSE)

1870 disestablishments in the United Kingdom
1867 establishments in the United Kingdom
Satirical magazines published in the United Kingdom
Weekly magazines published in the United Kingdom
Defunct magazines published in the United Kingdom
Magazines established in 1867
Magazines disestablished in 1870